Dalli-Rajhara railway station is a small railway station in Dalli-Rajhara, Chhattisgarh. Its code is DRZ. It serves Dalli Rajhara city. The station consists of two platforms. The platform is not well sheltered. It lacks many facilities including water and sanitation.

Major trains 
 Dalli Rajhara–Raipur DEMU
Dalli Rajahra–Durg DEMU 
 Dalli Rajhara–Durg Passenger Special
 Dalli Rajahra–Gondia DEMU
Keoti–Durg DEMU
Raipur–Gudum DEMU
Dalli Rajahra–Keoti DEMU

References

Railway stations in Balod district
Raipur railway division